New Plymouth is a city in Payette County, Idaho. The population was 1,538 at the 2010 census, up from 1400 in 2000. It was incorporated on February 15, 1896. It is the host of the annual Payette County Fair and rodeo.

New Plymouth is part of the Ontario, OR–ID Micropolitan Statistical Area.

History
New Plymouth was a colony town, bought and planned before it was settled. It was the combined project of a group of people purportedly dissatisfied with city life in Chicago, who in 1895 formed what they called "The Plymouth Society of Chicago" and William E. Smythe, who was the chairman of the executive committee of the National Irrigation Congress and a famous irrigation promoter. Mr. Smythe was determined to found a colony to serve as a striking argument in favor of his project - irrigation. He spoke throughout the east, urging young and old men to go west in colonies and develop the country with the help of irrigation. He wanted the first colony to be called New Plymouth — after Plymouth, Massachusetts — and wanted it located in southwestern Idaho in the Payette Valley, which he had found apt for his purpose because of the extraordinary water supply via the nearby Payette River.

The Plymouth Society of Chicago selected a committee to investigate the irrigated Payette River Valley in the five-year-old state of Idaho, and another site in Colorado, to be purchased for the colony. The present city of New Plymouth was on the drawing boards in Chicago, designed as a town able to be self-reliant through the use of irrigation, solidly built on an agricultural and railroad economy.

He was to clear the land of sagebrush and plant fruit trees, preferably apples. The town was platted with a horseshoe shape with its open end facing to the north, toward the railroad and the river. This area was planned as an industrial zone, and the acre tracts around the horseshoe were the residential lots.

The homes were to be built on the street side and the balance of the acre for garden and pasture for the family cow and the driving team. Two streets, separated by an  park, curve around the town in a horseshoe shape. This mile-long (1.6 km) park and the streets that enclose it were called "The Boulevard." The park was planted with grass and shade trees. Plymouth Avenue, the main street and principal business thoroughfare, was surveyed (16 feet off the section line) down the center of the horseshoe from the railroad on the north through the Boulevard on the south.

The community was at first called the New Plymouth Farm Village and was governed by a colony board of directors until it incorporated as a village in 1908, dropping the last two words in the name.

Geography

Demographics

2010 census
At the 2010 census there were 1,538 people in 565 households, including 405 families, in the city. The racial makup of the city was 89.3% White, 0.2% African American, 0.5% Native American, 0.3% Asian, 6.8% from other races, and 2.9% from two or more races. Hispanic or Latino of any race were 13.3%.

Of the 565 households 37.5% had children under the age of 18 living with them, 54.7% were married couples living together, 11.5% had a female householder with no husband present, 5.5% had a male householder with no wife present, and 28.3% were non-families. 23.5% of households were one person and 11.8% were one person aged 65 or older. The average household size was 2.72 and the average family size was 3.23.

The median age was 36.1 years. 29.4% of residents were under the age of 18; 7.6% were between the ages of 18 and 24; 24% were from 25 to 44; 22.9% were from 45 to 64; and 16% were 65 or older. The gender makeup of the city was 49.7% male and 50.3% female.

2000 census
At the 2000 census there were 1,400 people in 524 households, including 372 families, in the city. The racial makup of the city was 94.36% White, 0.29% African American, 0.79% Native American, 0.21% Asian, 2.86% from other races, and 1.50% from two or more races. Hispanic or Latino of any race were 9.86%.

Of the 524 households 38.0% had children under the age of 18 living with them, 56.1% were married couples living together, 10.7% had a female householder with no husband present, and 29.0% were non-families. 25.6% of households were one person and 13.7% were one person aged 65 or older. The average household size was 2.67 and the average family size was 3.23.

The age distribution was 31.7% under the age of 18, 6.7% from 18 to 24, 27.9% from 25 to 44, 18.6% from 45 to 64, and 15.1% 65 or older. The median age was 34 years. For every 100 females, there were 95.3 males. For every 100 females age 18 and over, there were 88.6 males.

The median household income was $30,524 and the median family income was $33,224. Males had a median income of $28,529 versus $21,161 for females. The per capita income for the city was $12,624. About 12.3% of families and 17.2% of the population were below the poverty line, including 25.9% of those under age 18 and 8.9% of those age 65 or over.

Government
New Plymouth contracts with Payette County Sheriff's for Law Enforcement. The city is governed by an elected mayor and members of the city council.

Points of interest
 Tuttle Blacksmith Shop, the oldest building in town
 The Waterwheels located on Southwest First Avenue
 Payette County Fairgrounds
 Internet Truck Stops Headquarters
 New Plymouth High School
 Armoral Tuttle Public Library
 123 Elm Street
 Belva's kitchen

Boulevard
The Boulevard is the main residential area and the original setting of the town. There are many unique things about the boulevard. First, it is in the shape of a horseshoe with a large park down the middle. Also, a system of ditches parallel the roads and drain into the canal, giving each landowner who pays for a share access to irrigation water. This comes from the days when farming was intended to be done inside the city. It is now used for gardening or watering the lawn. It also now includes a frisbee golf course along the west side.

See also
 National Irrigation Congress

References

External links
  - City of New Plymouth
 City website
 Payette County Fair
 Payette County USGenWeb

Cities in Payette County, Idaho
Cities in Idaho
Ontario, Oregon micropolitan area
Populated places established in 1895
1895 establishments in Idaho